War in Somalia can refer to:

Somali Civil War (1991–present)
War in Somalia (1992–1993) U.N. Unified Task Force
Somalia War (2006–2009), Ethiopian intervention
Somali Civil War (2009–present)